Vysokyi is an urban-type settlement in Kharkiv Raion of Kharkiv Oblast in Ukraine. Vysokyi hosts the administration of Vysokyi settlement hromada, one of the hromadas of Ukraine. Population:

Economy

Transportation
Four railway stations, Naukovyi, Vysokyi,  Zelenyi Hai, and Pivdennyi, are located in Vysokyi. They are on the railway connecting Kharkiv and Synelnykove via Lozova and Pavlohrad. There is significant passenger traffic through these stations.

Highway M18 connecting Kharkiv with Dnipro and Zaporizhzhia runs through the settlement.

References

Urban-type settlements in Kharkiv Raion